Conrad George Grob (rhymes with "robe"; November 9, 1932 – September 28, 1997) was an American professional baseball player in the 1950s and 1960s. A right-handed pitcher, he spent one full season —  — in Major League Baseball as a member of the Washington Senators.

A native of Cross Plains, Wisconsin, Grob signed originally with the Brooklyn Dodgers before the 1952 season and won 24 games (losing five) in his debut year in the Class D Wisconsin State League. After two years in military service, the Dodgers moved him up to the Double-A Southern Association and he responded by posting a winning record with the 1955 Mobile Bears. Washington then selected him in the Rule 5 draft that November.

Grob spent the entire 1956 season with the Senators, appearing in 37 games (36 in relief). He surrendered 121 hits and 14 home runs in only 79⅓ innings pitched, striking out 27.

At season's end, he was reacquired by Brooklyn and spent the rest of his active career at the top level of the minor leagues with the Dodgers, Milwaukee Braves and Houston Colt .45s. He retired after the 1965 Pacific Coast League season.

Connie Grob died in Madison, Wisconsin, at age 64.

References

External links

Venezuelan Professional Baseball League – Batting and Pitching statistics

1932 births
1997 deaths
Baseball players from Wisconsin
Leones del Caracas players
American expatriate baseball players in Venezuela
Licoreros de Pampero players
Los Angeles Angels (minor league) players
Louisville Colonels (minor league) players
Major League Baseball pitchers
Mobile Bears players
Montreal Royals players
Oklahoma City 89ers players
People from Dane County, Wisconsin
Sheboygan Indians players
Spokane Indians players
Washington Senators (1901–1960) players